The 2023 Prototype Cup Germany will be the second season of the Prototype Cup Germany. Creventic and German automobile club ADAC are the organizers and promoters of the series. The races will be contested with Le Mans Prototype and Group CN cars, as well as some special prototypes. The season will start on 28th April at the Hockenheimring and will end on 15 October at the Nürburgring.

Calendar

Teams and drivers

See also
24H Series

References

External links

Prototype Cup Germany
Prototype Cup Germany
Prototype Cup Germany